MRRC may refer to:
Mangere Refugee Resettlement Centre, a refugee resettlement centre in New Zealand
Metropolitan Remand and Reception Centre, a prison in Sydney, Australia
Mystic River Rugby Club, a rugby club in Massachusetts, United States